Hugo Jalmari Lahtinen (29 November 1891, Tampere – 29 December 1977) was a Finnish athlete who mainly competed in the men's pentathlon during his career. He competed for Finland at the 1920 Summer Olympics held in Antwerp, Belgium where he won the bronze medal in the men's pentathlon event.

References

External links
sports-reference

1891 births
1977 deaths
Sportspeople from Tampere
Finnish decathletes
Olympic bronze medalists for Finland
Athletes (track and field) at the 1920 Summer Olympics
Athletes (track and field) at the 1924 Summer Olympics
Olympic athletes of Finland
Medalists at the 1920 Summer Olympics
Olympic bronze medalists in athletics (track and field)
Olympic decathletes
19th-century Finnish people
20th-century Finnish people